James Kinchen (born March 1, 1958) is an American former professional boxer who competed from 1980 to 1992. Nicknamed "The Heat", Kinchen is best known for his bout against Thomas Hearns for the inaugural WBO super middleweight title. He also challenged twice for world titles at light heavyweight.

Amateur career 
Kinchen started his career out of McKinney, Texas as a three-time Golden Gloves champion, as well as three-time Southwestern AAU champion. He ended his amateur career with a record of 127-12.

Professional career 

Kinchen made his professional debut on August 8, 1980, defeating O'Daniel Marks via first-round knockout (KO) at the Dallas Convention Center. He won his first title on November 24, 1984, stopping Alex Ramos via ninth-round KO for the USBA middleweight title. He later captured the vacant NABF super middleweight title on October 13, 1988 with a unanimous decision victory over Marvin Mack. Less than a month later he challenged Thomas Hearns for the newly-created WBO super middleweight title, replacing an injured Fulgencio Obelmejias. Kinchen knocked Hearns down in the fourth round of the fight, but ultimately lost a close majority decision. Kinchen also challenged for the WBA and IBF light-heavyweight world titles.

Professional boxing record

|-
|align="center" colspan=8|49 Wins (34 KOs), 9 Losses (4 KOs), 2 Draws 
|-
| align="center" style="border-style: none none solid solid; background: #e3e3e3"|Result
| align="center" style="border-style: none none solid solid; background: #e3e3e3"|Record
| align="center" style="border-style: none none solid solid; background: #e3e3e3"|Opponent
| align="center" style="border-style: none none solid solid; background: #e3e3e3"|Type
| align="center" style="border-style: none none solid solid; background: #e3e3e3"|Round
| align="center" style="border-style: none none solid solid; background: #e3e3e3"|Date
| align="center" style="border-style: none none solid solid; background: #e3e3e3"|Location
| align="center" style="border-style: none none solid solid; background: #e3e3e3"|Notes
|-align=center
|Loss
|
|align=left| Ernesto Magdaleno
|TKO
|8
|23/04/1992
|align=left| Marriott Hotel, Irvine, California, U.S.
|align=left|
|-
|Win
|
|align=left| Guillermo Chávez
|KO
|4
|29/08/1991
|align=left| Lakeside, California, U.S.
|
|-align=center
|Loss
|
|align=left| Charles Williams
|TKO
|2
|20/04/1991
|align=left| Caesars Atlantic City, Atlantic City, New Jersey, U.S.
|
|-
|Win
|
|align=left| Tim Williams
|PTS
|10
|07/06/1990
|align=left| Honolulu, Hawaii, U.S.
|
|-
|Win
|
|align=left| Jorge Amparo
|PTS
|10
|01/03/1990
|align=left| Palm Springs, California, U.S.
|
|-align=center
|Loss
|
|align=left| Virgil Hill
|TKO
|1
|24/10/1989
|align=left| Bismarck Civic Center, Bismarck, North Dakota, U.S.
|
|-
|Win
|
|align=left| Stacy McSwain
|TKO
|5
|08/06/1989
|align=left| Trump Castle, Atlantic City, New Jersey, U.S.
|
|-
|Loss
|
|align=left| Christophe Tiozzo
|PTS
|10
|31/03/1989
|align=left| Issy-les-Moulineaux, Hauts-de-Seine, France
|
|-align=center
|Loss
|
|align=left| Thomas Hearns
|MD
|12
|04/11/1988
|align=left| Las Vegas Hilton, Las Vegas, Nevada, U.S.
|
|-align=center
|Win
|
|align=left| Marvin Mack
|UD
|12
|13/10/1988
|align=left| Stateline, Nevada, U.S.
|
|-
|Win
|
|align=left| Juan Hernández
|UD
|10
|19/05/1988
|align=left| El Cortez Hotel, San Diego, California, U.S.
|align=left|
|-
|Win
|
|align=left| James Williams
|KO
|4
|02/05/1988
|align=left| Tijuana, Baja California, Mexico
|align=left|
|-
|Win
|
|align=left| Ricky Locke
|KO
|3
|17/03/1988
|align=left| San Diego, California, U.S.
|align=left|
|-
|Win
|
|align=left| Antonio Adame
|KO
|2
|26/02/1988
|align=left| Tijuana, Baja California, Mexico
|
|-align=center
|Win
|
|align=left| Tim Williams
|PTS
|12
|27/01/1988
|align=left| San Diego, California, U.S.
|
|-
|Win
|
|align=left| Milford Kemp
|UD
|10
|19/11/1987
|align=left| El Cortez Hotel, San Diego, California, U.S.
|
|-
|Loss
|
|align=left| Larry Musgrove
|TD
|3
|25/08/1987
|align=left| Reseda Country Club, Reseda, California, U.S.
|
|-
|Win
|
|align=left| Randy Smith
|UD
|10
|18/06/1987
|align=left| El Cortez Hotel, San Diego, California, U.S.
|align=left|
|-
|Loss
|
|align=left| Juan Roldán
|TKO
|9
|06/04/1987
|align=left| Caesars Palace, Las Vegas, Nevada, U.S.
|
|-
|Loss
|
|align=left| Iran Barkley
|SD
|10
|17/10/1986
|align=left| Cobo Arena, Detroit, Michigan, U.S.
|
|-
|Win
|
|align=left| Frank Minton
|KO
|7
|11/07/1986
|align=left| Sahara Hotel and Casino, Las Vegas, Nevada, U.S.
|
|-
|Win
|
|align=left| Frank Minton
|TKO
|9
|30/07/1985
|align=left| Tropicana Hotel & Casino, Atlantic City, New Jersey, U.S.
|
|-
|Win
|
|align=left| Buster Drayton
|PTS
|10
|14/04/1985
|align=left| York Hall, London, England

|-align=center
|Loss
|
|align=left| James Shuler
|SD
|12
|16/02/1985
|align=left| The Sands, Atlantic City, New Jersey, U.S.
|
|-align=center
|Win
|
|align=left| Alex Ramos
|KO
|9
|24/11/1984
|align=left| Caesars Tahoe, Stateline, Nevada, U.S.
|
|-
|Draw
|
|align=left| Jorge Amparo
|PTS
|10
|26/09/1984
|align=left| Harrah's Marina, Atlantic City, New Jersey, U.S.
|
|-
|Win
|
|align=left| Erwin Williams
|TKO
|9
|25/05/1984
|align=left| San Jose, California, U.S.
|align=left|
|-
|Win
|
|align=left| Al Rankin
|TKO
|3
|26/02/1984
|align=left| Beaumont Civic Center, Beaumont, Texas, U.S.
|align=left|
|-
|Win
|
|align=left| Murray Sutherland
|UD
|10
|19/11/1983
|align=left| St. Joseph Civic Arena, Saint Joseph, Missouri, U.S.
|align=left|
|-
|Win
|
|align=left| Juan Diaz
|TKO
|2
|13/08/1983
|align=left| The Dunes, Las Vegas, Nevada, U.S.
|align=left|
|-
|Win
|
|align=left| José Mireles
|KO
|1
|16/07/1983
|align=left| State Fair Coliseum, Dallas, Texas, U.S.
|align=left|
|-
|Win
|
|align=left| Felton Marshall
|TKO
|9
|28/05/1983
|align=left| Showboat Hotel and Casino, Las Vegas, Nevada, U.S.
|align=left|
|-
|Win
|
|align=left| Fred Reed
|KO
|1
|19/05/1983
|align=left| North Park Palisade Gardens, San Diego, California, U.S.
|align=left|
|-
|Win
|
|align=left|Ernesto Caballero
|TKO
|8
|07/04/1983
|align=left| North Park Palisade Gardens, San Diego, California, U.S.
|align=left|
|-
|Win
|
|align=left| Mike Clark
|PTS
|10
|20/01/1983
|align=left| North Park Palisade Gardens, San Diego, California, U.S.
|align=left|
|-
|Win
|
|align=left| Ralph Moncrief
|PTS
|10
|31/10/1982
|align=left| Great Gorge Resort, McAfee, New Jersey, U.S.
|align=left|
|-
|Win
|
|align=left| Tommy Howard
|KO
|10
|30/09/1982
|align=left| North Park Palisade Gardens, San Diego, California, U.S.
|align=left|
|-
|Win
|
|align=left| Odell Hadley
|UD
|10
|05/09/1982
|align=left| St. Joseph Civic Arena, Saint Joseph, Missouri, U.S.
|align=left|
|-
|Win
|
|align=left| Joe Gonsalves
|KO
|5
|27/08/1982
|align=left| San Jose, California, U.S.
|align=left|
|-
|Win
|
|align=left| Alejo Rodriguez
|KO
|4
|23/05/1982
|align=left| Showboat Hotel and Casino, Las Vegas, Nevada, U.S.
|align=left|
|-
|Win
|
|align=left| Leroy Green, Jr.
|TKO
|9
|27/03/1982
|align=left| Playboy Hotel and Casino, Atlantic City, New Jersey, U.S.
|align=left|
|-
|Win
|
|align=left| Rudy Robles
|UD
|10
|17/02/1982
|align=left| Silver Slipper, Las Vegas, Nevada, U.S.
|align=left|
|-
|Win
|
|align=left| Marvin Sanders
|KO
|10
|13/01/1982
|align=left| Silver Slipper, Las Vegas, Nevada, U.S.
|align=left|
|-
|Win
|
|align=left| Jesse Avila
|TKO
|6
|28/11/1981
|align=left| Silver Slipper, Las Vegas, Nevada, U.S.
|align=left|
|-
|Win
|
|align=left| Ronnie Brown
|KO
|6
|04/11/1981
|align=left| Silver Slipper, Las Vegas, Nevada, U.S.
|align=left|
|-
|Win
|
|align=left| Everett Conklin
|KO
|6
|30/09/1981
|align=left| Silver Slipper, Las Vegas, Nevada, U.S.
|align=left|
|-
|Draw
|
|align=left| Everett Conklin
|PTS
|8
|21/08/1981
|align=left| Caesars Palace, Las Vegas, Nevada, U.S.
|align=left|
|-
|Win
|
|align=left| Adolfo Rivas
|KO
|2
|29/07/1981
|align=left| Silver Slipper, Las Vegas, Nevada, U.S.
|align=left|
|-
|Win
|
|align=left|Darryl Womack
|KO
|2
|08/07/1981
|align=left| Silver Slipper, Las Vegas, Nevada, U.S.
|
|-
|Win
|
|align=left| Ruben Rascon
|KO
|1
|17/06/1981
|align=left| Silver Slipper, Las Vegas, Nevada, U.S.
|align=left|
|-
|Win
|
|align=left| James Williams
|KO
|2
|12/06/1981
|align=left| San Diego Sports Arena, San Diego, California, U.S.
|align=left|
|-
|Win
|
|align=left| Eddie Casper
|KO
|2
|03/06/1981
|align=left| Silver Slipper, Las Vegas, Nevada, U.S.
|align=left|
|-
|Win
|
|align=left| Mike Hutchinson
|KO
|3
|01/05/1981
|align=left| Sea World Pavilion, San Diego, California, U.S.
|align=left|
|-
|Win
|
|align=left| Larry Meyers
|KO
|2
|15/04/1981
|align=left| Las Vegas, Nevada, U.S.
|align=left|
|-
|Win
|
|align=left| Jimmy Owens
|PTS
|6
|25/03/1981
|align=left| Silver Slipper, Las Vegas, Nevada, U.S.
|align=left|
|-
|Win
|
|align=left| Danny Kirk
|KO
|1
|18/02/1981
|align=left| Silver Slipper, Las Vegas, Nevada, U.S.
|align=left|
|-
|Win
|
|align=left| Fred Garcia
|KO
|2
|28/01/1981
|align=left| Sea World Pavilion, San Diego, California, U.S.
|align=left|
|-
|Win
|
|align=left| Henry Drummond
|PTS
|4
|21/01/1981
|align=left| Silver Slipper, Las Vegas, Nevada, U.S.
|
|-
|Win
|
|align=left| Larry Rayford
|TKO
|2
|23/09/1980
|align=left| Louisiana Superdome, New Orleans, Louisiana, U.S.
|
|-align=center
|Win
|
|align=left|O'Daniel Marks
|KO
|1
|08/08/1980
|align=left| Dallas Convention Center, Dallas, Texas, U.S.
|
|}

Pro Boxing Titles 
USBA middleweight champion
NABF middleweight champion

Personal life 
Kinchen now resides in San Diego, California. Also a convert to the Church of God in Christ, longtime member now Pastor of Helping Hand COGIC.

References

External links
 

1958 births
Living people
African-American boxers
Middleweight boxers
Light-heavyweight boxers
American male boxers
Boxers from San Diego
21st-century African-American people
20th-century African-American sportspeople